Mirbelia balsiformis is a species of flowering plant in the family Fabaceae and is endemic to the far west of Western Australia. It is an erect to sprawling shrub with leaves reduced to triangular scales, and yellow to orange and red flowers arranged in racemes on the side of the branchlets.

Description

Taxonomy
Mirbelia balsiformis was first formally described in 2012 by Ryonen Butcher in the journal Nuytsia from specimens collected near Useless Loop Road near Denham in 1994. The specific epithet (balsiformis) is an allusion to pre-Columbian balsa boats, referring to the shape of the fruit.

Distribution and habitat
This mirbelia grows on sandplains or low sand dunes in the area of Shark Bay to near Kalbarri in the Yalgoo bioregion of far western Western Australia.

Conservation status
This mirbelia is listed as "not threatened" by the Government of Western Australia Department of Biodiversity, Conservation and Attractions,

References

Mirbelioids
balsiformis
Fabales of Australia
Flora of Western Australia
Plants described in 2012